Shane O'Mara may refer to:
Shane O'Mara (rower)
Shane O'Mara (musician)
Shane O'Mara (neuroscientist)